Helsingius is a surname. Notable people with the surname include:

 Barbara Helsingius (1937–2017), Finnish fencer, singer, and poet
 Johan Helsingius (born 1961), Finnish computer scientist
 Olaus Canuti Helsingius (1520–1607), Swedish prelate